Kyle Alexander Joseph (born 10 September 2001) is a professional footballer who plays as a forward for Oxford United on loan from Swansea City. Born in England, Joseph is a youth international for Scotland.

Early life and education
Born in Chipping Barnet, Joseph attended Birkdale High School in Southport.

Club career

Wigan Athletic
Joseph joined Wigan Athletic's academy at the age of 13 and signed his first professional contract with the club in February 2019, lasting until summer 2021. Joseph made his debut as a substitute in a 3–2 defeat at home to Northampton Town on 31 October 2020, before making his full debut for the club against Blackpool on 3 November. He scored his first goal for Wigan on 5 December 2020 with the only goal of a 1–0 League One victory over Sunderland. On 29 December, he scored his first senior hat-trick as Wigan defeated Burton Albion 4–3 in League One. Joseph was substituted in the second half of a 5–0 defeat at home to Blackpool on 26 January 2021 through a back injury, with manager Leam Richardson stating that "he will be out for a large part of the season" in response to the injury. He returned to the matchday squad for a 2–0 win over Crewe Alexandra on 17 April 2021, coming on as an 89th-minute substitute. He scored 5 goals in 20 appearances across the 2020–21 campaign.

Swansea City
On 11 June 2021, it was announced that Joseph had agreed to join Swansea City on a four-year deal, with Swansea paying a compensation fee of around £500,000 plus add-ons. He made his debut for the club on 10 August 2021 in a 3–0 EFL Cup win over Reading. After two EFL Cup appearances for Swansea, he joined League One club Cheltenham Town on a season-long loan on 31 August 2021. Joseph scored on his debut for the club with the opening goal of a 1–1 draw with Milton Keynes Dons on 4 September 2021. He scored a brace in a 3–1 win over Morecambe on 19 October 2021. He scored 4 goals in 19 league matches before being recalled from his loan on 5 January 2022. He made 10 Championship appearances for Swansea in the second half of the 2021–22 season, all of them as a substitute.

International career
He has played for Scotland internationally at under-18, under-19 and under-21 levels.

Style of play
Joseph usually plays as a striker, but has also been used as a right wing back on occasion for Swansea City and Cheltenham Town.

Career statistics

References

2001 births
Living people
Scottish footballers
English footballers
English people of Scottish descent
Footballers from Chipping Barnet
Association football forwards
Wigan Athletic F.C. players
Swansea City A.F.C. players
Cheltenham Town F.C. players
English Football League players
Scotland youth international footballers
Scotland under-21 international footballers